Sagamore may refer to:

 Sachem or "Sagamore", denoting the head of some Native American tribes
 Wampatuck (died 1669), Native American leader known as "Josiah Sagamore" to English settlers

Places in the United States
 Sagamore, Massachusetts, a village located in the town of Bourne
 Sagamore, Pennsylvania (disambiguation)
 Sagamore Bridge, crossing the Cape Cod Canal in Massachusetts, US
 Sagamore Camp, one of the "Great Camps" in the Adirondack Mountains in upstate New York 
 Sagamore Hill, the home of President Theodore Roosevelt in Oyster Bay, New York
 Sagamore Hill Military Reservation, a former military reservation protecting the Cape Cod Canal
 The Sagamore, grand Victorian hotel on Lake George, New York

Ships
 Sagamore (barge), an 1892 whaleback barge
 Sagamore (ship), a list of ships
 USS Sagamore, a list of U.S. Navy ships

Other uses
 Sagamore Honor Society, an honor society at Washburn University
 The Sagamore (Brookline High School), student-run newspaper  since renamed to The Cypress
 Sagamore Stévenin (born 1974), French actor
 Sagamore of the Wabash, an honorary award conferred by the governor of Indiana

See also